{{DISPLAYTITLE:C21H28N2OS}}
The molecular formula C21H28N2OS (molar mass: 356.52 g/mol, exact mass: 356.1922 u) may refer to:

 Alphamethylthiofentanyl
 3-Methylthiofentanyl

Molecular formulas